Schizoculina fissipara is a species of colonial stony coral in the family Oculinidae found in the eastern Atlantic Ocean on the western coast of Africa.

Description
The upright branches are blueish grey or pale brown. Sometimes several of them are linked in series. Schizoculina fissipara has a symbiotic relationship with zooxanthellae, microalgae that live within the tissue of the polyp.

References

Oculinidae
Animals described in 1850
Taxa named by Henri Milne-Edwards
Taxa named by Jules Haime